Richard Glover may refer to:

 Richard Glover (pirate) (died 1697/98), pirate captain and slave trader active in the Red Sea
 Richard Glover (poet) (1712–1785), English poet and MP
 Richard Glover (radio presenter) (born 1958), Australian radio announcer
 Rich Glover (born 1950), American football player